Shawkat Jamil Dallal (25 October 1931 – 3 July 2016) was a Palestinian-American author, professor, and human rights activist. His novels include "Scattered like Seeds" and "The Secret of Rose-Anne Riley".

Early life and education
Dallal, the youngest of eight children, was born in Tulkarm city, British Mandatory Palestine, on October 25, 1931. He studied at Al Fadiliyeh High School in Tulkarm and at St. George High School in Jerusalem. His family farmed.

He completed his studies at Cornell in 1959 with a doctorate of jurisprudence.

Career

From 1991 to 2004, he was an adjunct professor of political science at the Maxwell School at Syracuse University.

References

Palestinian novelists
Cornell University alumni
People from Tulkarm